Hasankeyf District is a district of Batman Province in Turkey. The town of Hasankeyf is the seat and the district had a population of 7,496 in 2021. Its area is 293 km2.

Composition
There is one municipality in Hasankeyf District:
 Hasankeyf

There are 22 villages in Hasankeyf District:

 Akalın
 Aksu
 Bayırlı
 Büyükdere
 Çardaklı
 Gaziler
 Güneşli
 Irmakköy
 İncirli
 Karaköy
 Kayıklı
 Kelekçi
 Kumluca
 Öğütlü
 Palamut
 Saklı
 Soğucak
 Tepebaşı
 Uzundere
 Üçyol
 Yakaköy
 Yolüstü

The district encompasses 7 hamlets.

References 

Districts of Batman Province